László Fábián (born 18 February 1963) is a Hungarian modern pentathlete and Olympic champion. He participated on the Hungarian team which won a gold medal at the 1988 Summer Olympics in Seoul. He also competed in the team épée fencing event at the 1988 Games.

Awards
Fábián was elected Hungarian Sportsman of the Year 1989. The Olympic gold-winning pentathlon team, of which Fábián was a member, was elected Hungarian Team of the year 1988.

References

1963 births
Living people
Hungarian male modern pentathletes
Hungarian male épée fencers
Olympic modern pentathletes of Hungary
Olympic fencers of Hungary
Modern pentathletes at the 1988 Summer Olympics
Modern pentathletes at the 1992 Summer Olympics
Fencers at the 1988 Summer Olympics
Olympic gold medalists for Hungary
Olympic medalists in modern pentathlon
World Modern Pentathlon Championships medalists
Medalists at the 1988 Summer Olympics
Sportspeople from Budapest
20th-century Hungarian people
21st-century Hungarian people